ANARESAT or Australian National Antarctic Research Expeditions Satellite is a communication solution using Intelsat Geostationary communication satellites to allow Australian Antarctic Division sites to communicate.

The installation includes a 7.3 m dish antenna, and a large dark dome to protect the satellite from the harsh weather conditions.  It was installed at:

 Davis Station in March 1987, 
 Mawson Station in January 1988, 
 Casey Station in March 1988, and 
 Macquarie Island Station in December 1988.

References

Satellite telephony